The National Physical Laboratory (NPL) is the national measurement standards laboratory of the United Kingdom. It sets and maintains physical standards for British industry.

Founded in 1900, the NPL is one of the oldest metrology institutes in the world. Research and development work at the laboratory has contributed to the advancement of many disciplines of science, including the development early computers in the late 1940s and 1950s, construction of the first accurate atomic clock in 1955, and the invention and pioneering implementation of packet switching in the 1960s, which is today one of the fundamental technologies of the Internet. The former heads of NPL include many individuals who were pillars of the British scientific establishment.

NPL is based at Bushy Park in Teddington, west London. It is managed under the Department for Business, Energy and Industrial Strategy and is one of the most extensive government laboratories in the United Kingdom.

History

Precursors 
In the 19th century, the Kew Observatory was run by self-funded devotees of science. In the early 1850s, the observatory began charging fees for testing meteorological instruments and other scientific equipment. As universities in the United Kingdom created and expanded physics departments, the governing committee of the Observatory became increasingly dominated by paid university physicists in the last two decades of the nineteenth century. By this time, instrument-testing was the observatory's main role. Physicists sought the establishment of a state-funded scientific institution for testing electrical standards.

Founding 
The National Physical Laboratory was established in 1900 at Bushy House in Teddington on the site of the Kew Observatory. Its purpose was "for standardising and verifying instruments, for testing materials, and for the determination of physical constants". The laboratory was run by the UK government, with members of staff being part of the civil service. It grew to fill a large selection of buildings on the Teddington site.

Late 20th century 
Administration of NPL was contracted out in 1995 under a Government Owned Contractor Operated model, with Serco winning the bid and all staff transferred to their employment. Under this regime, overhead costs halved, third-party revenues grew by 16% per annum, and the number of peer-reviewed research papers published doubled.

NPL procured a large state-of-the-art laboratory under a Private Finance Initiative contract in 1998. The construction was undertaken by John Laing.

21st century 
The maintenance of the new laboratory building, which was being undertaken by Serco, was transferred back to the DTI in 2004 after the private sector companies involved made losses of over £100m.

It was decided in 2012 to change the operating model for NPL from 2014 onwards to include academic partners and to establish a postgraduate teaching institute on site. The date of the changeover was later postponed for a year. The candidates for lead academic partner were the Universities of Edinburgh, Southampton, Strathclyde and Surrey with an alliance of the Universities of Strathclyde and Surrey chosen as preferred partners.

Funding was announced in January 2013 for a new £25m Advanced Metrology Laboratory that will be built on the footprint of an existing unused building.

The operation of the laboratory transferred back to the Department for Business, Innovation and Skills (now the Department for Business, Energy and Industrial Strategy) on 1 January 2015.

Notable researchers

Researchers who have worked at NPL include: D. W. Dye who did important work in developing the technology of quartz clocks; the inventor Sir Barnes Wallis who did early development work on the "Bouncing Bomb" used in the "Dam Busters" wartime raids; H.J. Gough, one of the pioneers of research into metal fatigue, who worked at NPL for 19 years from 1914 to 1938; and Sydney Goldstein and Sir James Lighthill who worked in NPL's aerodynamics division during World War II researching boundary layer theory and supersonic aerodynamics respectively.

Alan Turing, known for his work at the Government Code and Cypher School (GC&CS) at Bletchley Park  during the Second World War to decipher German encrypted messages, worked at the National Physical Laboratory from 1945 to 1947. He designed there the ACE (Automatic Computing Engine), which was one of the first designs for a stored-program computer. Dr Clifford Hodge also worked there and was engaged in research on semiconductors. Others who have spent time at NPL include Robert Watson-Watt, generally considered the inventor of radar, Oswald Kubaschewski, the father of computational materials thermodynamics and the numerical analyst James Wilkinson.

Metallurgist Walter Rosenhain appointed the NPL's first female scientific staff members in 1915, Marie Laura Violet Gayler and Isabel Hadfield.

Research
NPL research has contributed to physical science, materials science, computing, and bioscience. Applications have been found in ship design, aircraft development, radar, computer networking, and global positioning.

Atomic clocks

The first accurate atomic clock, a caesium standard based on a certain transition of the caesium-133 atom, was built by Louis Essen and Jack Parry in 1955 at NPL. Calibration of the caesium standard atomic clock was carried out by the use of the astronomical time scale ephemeris time (ET). This led to the internationally agreed definition of the latest SI second being based on atomic time.

Computing

Early computers 
NPL has undertaken computer research since the mid-1940s. From 1945, Alan Turing led the design of the Automatic Computing Engine (ACE) computer. The ACE project was overambitious and floundered, leading to Turing's departure. Donald Davies took the project over and concentrated on delivering the less ambitious Pilot ACE computer, which first worked in May 1950. Among those who worked on the project was American computer pioneer Harry Huskey. A commercial spin-off, DEUCE was manufactured by English Electric Computers and became one of the best-selling machines of the 1950s.

Packet switching

Beginning in the mid-1960s, Donald Davies and his team at the NPL pioneered packet switching, now the dominant basis for data communications in computer networks worldwide. Davies designed and proposed a commercial national data network based on packet switching in his 1965 Proposal for the Development of a National Communications Service for On-line Data Processing. Subsequently, the NPL team (Davies, Derek Barber, Roger Scantlebury, Peter Wilkinson, Keith Bartlett, and Brian Aldous) developed the concept into a local area network which operated from 1969 to 1986, and carried out work to analyse and simulate the performance of packet-switched networks, including datagram networks. Their research and practice influenced the ARPANET in the United States, the forerunner of the Internet, and other researchers in the UK and Europe, including Louis Pouzin.

NPL sponsors a gallery, opened in 2009, about the development of packet switching and "Technology of the Internet" at The National Museum of Computing.

Internetworking
NPL internetworking research was led by Davies, Barber and Scantlebury, who were members of the International Networking Working Group (INWG). Connecting heterogeneous computer networks creates a "basic dilemma" since a common host protocol would require restructuring the existing networks. NPL connected with the European Informatics Network (Barber directed the project and Scantlebury led the UK technical contribution) by translating between two different host protocols; that is, using a gateway. Concurrently, the NPL connection to the Post Office Experimental Packet Switched Service used a common host protocol in both networks. NPL research confirmed establishing a common host protocol would be more reliable and efficient. The EIN protocol helped to launch the proposed INWG standard. Bob Kahn and Vint Cerf acknowledged Davies and Scantlebury in their 1974 paper "A Protocol for Packet Network Intercommunication".

Scrapbook
Scrapbook was an information storage and retrieval system that went live in mid-1971. It included what would now be called word processing, e-mail and hypertext. In this it anticipated many elements of the World Wide Web. The project was managed by David Yates who said of it "We had a community of bright people that were interested in new things, they were good fodder for a system like Scrapbook" and "When we had more than one Scrapbook system, hyperlinks could go across the network without the user knowing what was happening". It was decided that any commercial development of Scrapbook should be left to industry and it was licensed to Triad and then to BT who marketed it as Milepost and developed a transaction processor as an additional feature. Various implementations were marketed on DEC, IBM and ITL machines. All NPL implementations of Scrapbook were closed down in 1984.

Network security 
In the early 1990s, the NPL developed three formal specifications of the MAA: one in Z, one in LOTOS, and one in VDM. The VDM specification became part of the 1992 revision of the International Standard 8731–2, and three implementations in C, Miranda, and Modula-2.

Electromagnetics

A 2020 study by researchers from Queen Mary University of London and NPL successfully used microwaves to measure blood-based molecules known to be influenced by dehydration.

Metrology 
The National Physical Laboratory is involved with new developments in metrology, such as researching metrology for, and standardising, nanotechnology. It is mainly based at the Teddington site, but also has a site in Huddersfield for dimensional metrology and an underwater acoustics facility at Wraysbury Reservoir near Heathrow Airport.

Directors of NPL

Directors of NPL include a number of notable individuals:
 Sir Richard Tetley Glazebrook, 1900–1919
 Sir Joseph Ernest Petavel, 1919–1936
 Sir Frank Edward Smith, 1936–1937 (acting)
 Sir William Lawrence Bragg, 1937–1938
 Sir Charles Galton Darwin, 1938–1949
 Sir Edward Victor Appleton, 1941 (acting)
 Sir Edward Crisp Bullard, 1948–1955
 Dr Reginald Leslie Smith-Rose, 1955–1956 (acting)
 Sir Gordon Brims Black McIvor Sutherland, 1956–1964
 Dr John Vernon Dunworth, 1964–1977
 Dr Paul Dean, 1977–1990
 Dr Peter Clapham, 1990–1995

Managing Directors
 Dr John Rae, 1995–2000
 Dr Bob McGuiness, 2000–2005
 Steve McQuillan, 2005–2008
 Dr Martyn Sené, 2008–2009, 2015 (acting)
 Dr Brian Bowsher, 2009–2015

Chief Executive Officers
  Dr Peter Thompson, 2015–present

NPL buildings

See also
List of UK government scientific research institutes
National Institute of Standards and Technology in the United States
National Physical Laboratory of India
VAMAS

References

Further reading

External links

 Official website
 The birth of the Internet in the UK Google video featuring Roger Scantlebury, Peter Wilkinson, Peter Kirstein and Vint Cerf, 2013
 NPL Video Podcast
 Second Health in Second Life
 NMS Home Page
 NPL YouTube channel
 NPL Sports and Social Club
 
 The National Physical Laboratory  apprentices
Benjamin Stone MP & the NPL – UK Parliament Living Heritage

 
1900 establishments in the United Kingdom
Buildings and structures in the London Borough of Richmond upon Thames
Bushy Park
Department for Business, Energy and Industrial Strategy
Laboratories in the United Kingdom
Metrology
Organisations based in the London Borough of Richmond upon Thames
Physics laboratories
Research institutes established in 1900
Research institutes in London
Science and technology in London
Serco
Standards organisations in the United Kingdom
Teddington
Alan Turing